Bishop Rayappu Joseph (16 April 1940 – 1 April 2021) was a Sri Lanka Tamil prelate and the Roman Catholic Bishop of Mannar.

Early life and family 

Joseph was born on 16 April 1940 on the island of Neduntheevu in northern Ceylon to a practitioner of indigenous medicine Living in Cheddikulam and Mannar during his early childhood, he was educated at St. Patrick's College, Jaffna. Joseph has a Doctor of Canon Law degree from the Pontifical Urbaniana University.

Career
Joseph was ordained as a priest in December 1967. He was a professor at the St Xavier's Seminary, Jaffna. In July 1992 he was appointed Bishop of Mannar and was ordained as a bishop in October 1992.

Joseph has been a vocal critic of the Sri Lankan government/Sri Lankan military's conduct during the Sri Lankan Civil War and the country's human rights record. This has led to him being threatened by government supporters.

References

External links
 

1940 births
2021 deaths
20th-century Roman Catholic bishops in Sri Lanka
Alumni of St. Patrick's College, Jaffna
People from Northern Province, Sri Lanka
People from British Ceylon
Pontifical Urban University alumni
Roman Catholic bishops of Mannar
Sri Lankan Tamil activists
Sri Lankan Tamil priests